Paulo Carvalho (born 13 March 1935) is a Uruguayan rower. He competed at the 1956 Summer Olympics and the 1960 Summer Olympics.

References

1935 births
Living people
Uruguayan male rowers
Olympic rowers of Uruguay
Rowers at the 1956 Summer Olympics
Rowers at the 1960 Summer Olympics
Sportspeople from Salto, Uruguay
Pan American Games medalists in rowing
Pan American Games silver medalists for Uruguay
Pan American Games bronze medalists for Uruguay
Rowers at the 1959 Pan American Games
20th-century Uruguayan people